Glyptotendipes is a genus of non-biting midges in the subfamily Chironominae of the bloodworm family Chironomidae.

Species
G. aequalis (Kieffer, 1922)
G. amplus Townes, 1945
G. barbipes (Stæger, 1839)
G. caulicola (Kieffer, 1913)
G. cauliginellus (Kieffer, 1913)
G. dreisbachi Townes, 1945
G. foliicola Contreras-Lichtenberg, 1997
G. glaucus (Meigen, 1818)
G. gripekoveni (Kieffer, 1913)
G. imbecilis (Walker, 1856)
G. lejcher (Hatfull, 2014)
G. lobiferus (Say, 1823)
G. meridionalis Dendy and Sublette, 1959
G. ospeli Contreras-Lichtenberg & Kiknadze, 1999
G. pallens (Meigen, 1804)
G. paripes (Edwards, 1929)
G. salinus Michailova, 1987
G. scirpi (Kieffer, 1915)
G. seminole Townes, 1945
G. senilis (Johannsen, 1937)
G. signatus (Kieffer, 1909)
G. testaceus (Townes, 1945)
G. unacus Townes, 1945 
G. viridis (Macquart, 1834)

References

Chironomidae
Nematoceran flies of Europe
Culicomorpha genera